Omiroupoli is a former municipality in the central part of on the island of Chios, North Aegean, Greece. Since the 2011 local government reform it is part of the municipality Chios, of which it is a municipal unit. The municipal unit has an area of 155.015 km2. Population 7,527 people (2011 census). The seat of the municipality was Vrontados (pop. 5,323), the second largest town on the island (after Chios (town)). The next largest towns are Lagkáda (760), Karyaí (618), and Sykiáda (562).

Tradition claims that epic poet Homer (Όμηρος) was born and lived here, thus the name of the municipal unit.

Historical population

See also
List of settlements in the Chios regional unit

References

External links
Official website 

Populated places in Chios